"Let Me Down" is a 2018 song by Jorja Smith.

Let Me Down may also refer to:
"Let Me Down", a 2002 song by No Use for a Name from Hard Rock Bottom
"Let Me Down", a 2006 song by Polytechnic released as a double A-side with "Won't You Come Around?"
"Let Me Down", a 2011 song by Kelly Clarkson from Stronger

See also
Let Me Down Easy (disambiguation)
Don't Let Me Down (disambiguation)
"Lose Control (Let Me Down)", by Keri Hilson featuring Nelly